Personality is a set of traits that define the way a person's behavior is perceived.  

In debate, a personality is a reference to a particular person.

Personality may also refer to:

Film and TV
Personality (film), 1930 American comedy
Personality (TV series), 1967 American game show

Literature
Personality (magazine), South African weekly magazine (1957–1965), successor to The Outspan
Personality (novel), 2003 work by Scottish author Andrew O'Hagan

Music
 "Personality" (Jimmy Van Heusen and Johnny Burke song), from 1946 American film Road to Utopia
"Personality"  (Lloyd Price song), 1959 R&B pop hit  
Personality (Nina Badrić album), by Croatian singer Nina Badrić

Other
Personality (horse) (1967–1990), 1970 American Horse of the Year

See also
 Radio personality
 Television personality
 Personality Comics, an American comic book publisher
 Personality and Individual Differences, a scientific journal published bi-monthly by Elsevier